Eric Tinkler (born 30 July 1970) is a South African football coach and former player who manages Cape Town City.

Early and personal life
Tinkler was born in Roodepoort.

Club career
Tinkler played club football for Wits University, União de Tomar,  Vitória, Cagliari, Barnsley, Caldas and Bidvest Wits.

Tinkler moved from Italian club Cagliari to English club Barnsley on 1 July 1997 for a transfer fee of £650,000.

International career
Tinkler earned 45 caps for the South African national team between 1994 and 2001, scoring 1 goal. He was part of the South Africa squad that won the 1996 African Cup of Nations, playing in the final.

Coaching career
Tinkler became head coach of Orlando Pirates in December 2013; in May 2015 it was announced that he would continue in that role for the 2015–16 season. Tinkler left Orlando Pirates to become the first head coach of Cape Town City club on 17 June 2016. On 8 June 2017 he moved to become head coach of SuperSport United. He quit in March 2018.

After a spell with Chippa United, he became manager of Maritzburg United in January 2019. He left the club in November 2020.

He returned as manager of Cape Town City on 24 May 2021.

Career statistics

Club

International

Honours
Cape Town City
Telkom Knockout Final

Supersport United
MTN 8 Cup Final

References

1970 births
Living people
People from Roodepoort
Expatriate footballers in England
Expatriate footballers in Portugal
Expatriate footballers in Italy
South African soccer players
South Africa international soccer players
South African expatriate soccer players
South African expatriate sportspeople in England
South African expatriate sportspeople in Portugal
South African expatriate sportspeople in Italy
Bidvest Wits F.C. players
Cagliari Calcio players
Barnsley F.C. players
Premier League players
Primeira Liga players
Serie A players
1996 African Cup of Nations players
1997 FIFA Confederations Cup players
2000 African Cup of Nations players
2002 African Cup of Nations players
White South African people
Caldas S.C. players
Orlando Pirates F.C. managers
Cape Town City F.C. (2016) managers
South African soccer managers
SuperSport United F.C. managers
Association football midfielders
English Football League players
Chippa United F.C. managers
Sportspeople from Gauteng